Freesendorfer See is a lake in Mecklenburg-Vorpommern, Germany. At an elevation of 0.1 m, its surface area is 0.48 km².

Lakes of Mecklenburg-Western Pomerania